Ramata Ly-Bakayoko (born 29 June 1955) is an Ivorian academic and government official. She served as Ivory Coast's Minister of Higher Education and Scientific Research from 2016 to 2018. She was appointed Minister of Women, Families, and Children in 2018. She was appointed permanent delegate of Côte d'Ivoire to UNESCO with residence in Paris on September 8, 2021.

Biography 
Ly-Bakayoko was born in Abidjan, Ivory Coast, in 1955. She earned degrees in dental surgery from Paris Diderot University in 1980 and in dental science from Paris Descartes University in 1985.

Ly-Bakayoko was a professor of pediatric dentistry. She headed the pediatric dentistry department at the University of Cocody (now Université Félix Houphouët-Boigny) in Abidjan, later becoming vice-dean of the faculty of dentistry, then vice-president of the university. From 2012 to 2016, Ly-Bakayoko served as the first female president of Université Félix Houphouët-Boigny. As president, she developed the Scientific and Innovation Centre in Bingerville, home to the West African Virus Epidemiology (WAVE) program.

Ly-Bakayoko served as Minister of Higher Education and Scientific Research from 2016 to 2018, succeeding Gnamien Konan. She was the first woman to hold this position. In 2018, she was appointed Minister of Women, Families, and Children.

Awards and honours 
In 2018, Ly-Bakayoko became the first Ivorian member of the French Académie des sciences d'outre-mer. In 2019, she was awarded an honorary doctorate from France's University of Franche-Comté.

References 

Living people
1955 births
21st-century Ivorian women politicians
21st-century Ivorian politicians
Ivorian women scientists
People from Abidjan
Ivorian political people
Academic staff of Université Félix Houphouët-Boigny
Paris Diderot University alumni
Paris Descartes University alumni